Nancy Zhou (born January 5, 1993) is a Chinese-American classical violinist.  She has performed as a soloist in recital and with orchestras throughout the world. Zhou has been a prizewinner in several major competitions, including first prizes in the 2018 Shanghai Isaac Stern International Violin Competition and the 2018 International Music Competition Harbin.

Early life and musical training
Zhou was born in San Antonio, Texas. She began violin study at age four with her father, Long Zhou, who continued to be her teacher throughout her youth. She graduated from the Keystone School in San Antonio.

Zhou studied with Miriam Fried at the New England Conservatory and also took lessons from David Nadien. She graduated from Harvard University in 2017.

Competitions
Zhou has received recognition at numerous competitions, including several top prizes:
  
 2009 Johansen International Competition, 1st prize
 2009 China International Violin Competition, 1st prize
 2010 International Jean Sibelius Violin Competition (Helsinki, Finland), finalist and recipient of the Rastor special award for the best performance of Kaija Saariaho's Tocar
 2011 International Tchaikovsky Competition, semifinalist
 2012 Queen Elisabeth Competition, Laureate
 2014 International Violin Competition of Indianapolis, semifinalist and winner of the top prize for Best Performance of Paganini Caprices
 2015 International Joseph Joachim Violin Competition, Hannover, semifinalist
 2015 International Jean Sibelius Violin Competition, finalist  
 2017 Isang Yun Competition, 2nd prize
 2018 International Music Competition Harbin, 1st prize ($50,000)
2018 Shanghai Isaac Stern International Violin Competition, 1st prize ($100,000)

Performing career
Zhou has performed as a soloist with the China National Symphony Orchestra, Hong Kong Philharmonic Orchestra, Shanghai Symphony Orchestra, Saint Petersburg Philharmonic Orchestra, Munich Symphony Orchestra, National Orchestra of Belgium, Armenian State Symphony Orchestra, Helsinki Philharmonic Orchestra, Finnish Radio Symphony Orchestra, Sichuan Symphony Orchestra, New Jersey Symphony, San Diego Symphony, San Antonio Symphony, Kansas City Symphony, Royal Stockholm Philharmonic Orchestra, San Antonio Philharmonic, Orchestre Royal de Chambre de Wallonie, Orchestra da Camera di Perugia, Orchestra del Teatro Goldoni di Livorno (it), Tongyeong Festival Orchestra, Baden-Baden Philharmonic, New York Classical Players, Queens Symphony Orchestra, Oulu Symphony, Kalisz Philharmonic Symphony Orchestra, Central Ostrobothnian Chamber Orchestra, Kuopio Symphony Orchestra, Tapiola Sinfonietta, and several other orchestras, and has performed recitals in the United States, Germany, Switzerland, Austria, China, Taiwan, Russia, Finland, and Belgium. She has collaborated with conductors Zhang Jiemin, Michael Stern, Christopher Seaman, Xian Zhang, Sakari Oramo, Jean-Jacques Kantorow, Sebastian Lang-Lessing, Ken-David Masur, Anna-Maria Helsing (sv), Atso Almila, Jurjen Hempel (nl), John Storgårds, Hu Yongyan, Jaap van Zweden, Adam Klocek, Jaime Laredo, Peter Oundjian, Garrett Keast, Sergey Smbatyan, Gábor Hontvári (de), Eun Sun Kim, Christoph Poppen, Muhai Tang, Dongmin Kim, Lio Kuokman, and Hannu Lintu.

Since 2008, she has been sponsored by the Anne-Sophie Mutter Foundation, frequently collaborating with the German violinist on tours in Europe, Asia, and the U.S. and receiving scholarships generously endowed by the foundation.

Discography
 Bach: Concerto for 2 Violins, Strings and Basso continuo, soloist for 3rd movement with Anne-Sophie Mutter. Anne-Sophie Mutter: The Club Album: Live from Yellow Lounge (2015). Deutsche Grammophon 479 5023.  (Zhou performs as a member of Mutter's Virtuosi for other selections on the album.)

External links
Nancy Zhou's webpage

References 

Living people
American violinists
1993 births
Musicians from San Antonio
Classical musicians from Texas
American musicians of Chinese descent
Harvard University alumni
21st-century violinists